Glenna Maxey Goodacre (August 28, 1939 – April 13, 2020) was an American sculptor, best known for having designed the obverse of the Sacagawea dollar that entered circulation in the US in 2000, and the Vietnam Women's Memorial in Washington, D.C.

Early life and career
Goodacre's father, Homer Glen Maxey was a Lubbock builder, developer and civic leader. A graduate of Texas Tech University in 1931, he was the first president of the Red Raider Club. He served on the Lubbock City Council from 1956 to 1960. A  city park bears the name of Homer Maxey's father, James Barney Maxey  (1881–1953), who was Glenna's paternal grandfather. James Maxey was also a prodigious builder and civic leader in Lubbock and the South Plains. Goodacre graduated from Monterey High School in Lubbock. She then completed studies at Colorado College and classes at the Art Students League in New York City. She moved to Santa Fe, New Mexico in 1983.

Art

Goodacre's art appears in public, private, municipal and museum collections throughout the U.S. Her bronze sculptures feature lively expression and texture. 
Her most well-known work is the Vietnam Women's Memorial installed in Washington, D.C. in 1993 of which there is smaller replica at Vietnam Veterans Memorial State Park in Angel Fire, New Mexico. Goodacre was selected in 1997 as sculptor for the monumental Irish Memorial in  Philadelphia. Completed and installed at Penn's Landing in 2003, the massive bronze is her most ambitious public sculpture—with 35 life-size figures. Another cast is at the National Cowboy & Western Heritage Museum in Oklahoma City. After a nationwide competition for a Sacagawea dollar coin design in 1999, Goodacre's rendering for the face was unveiled at the White House by then First Lady Hillary Clinton.

In 2004, her bronze portrait of West Point Coach Colonel Earl "Red" Blaik was dedicated at the National College Football Hall Of Fame. In 2004, she also designed the Children's Medal of Honor awarded to then First Lady Laura Bush in Dallas by the Greater Texas Community Partners.
   
An academician of the National Academy of Design and a fellow of the National Sculpture Society, Goodacre won many awards at their exhibitions in New York. Goodacre has received honorary doctorates from Colorado College, her alma mater, and Texas Tech University in her hometown of Lubbock. In 2002, Goodacre's work won the James Earl Fraser Sculpture Award at the Prix De West Exhibition. In 2003, she received the Texas Medal Of Arts and later that year was inducted into the National Cowgirl Museum and Hall of Fame in the Fort Worth historic district.

In 1997, Goodacre was inducted into the West Texas Walk of Fame in Lubbock. Eleven years later, Goodacre was named the 2008 "Notable New Mexican".  This honor, bestowed by the Albuquerque Art and History Museum's Foundation, celebrates extraordinary, living New Mexicans who contribute significantly to the public good. A portrait of Goodacre by the artist Daniel Greene is in the permanent collection of the Albuquerque Museum in Albuquerque, New Mexico.

In 2005, the former 8th Street from University Avenue east in Lubbock was named Glenna Goodacre Boulevard, and in Santa Fe at the State Capitol, then Governor Bill Richardson presented Goodacre with the New Mexico Governor's Award For Excellence in the Arts. In 2006, Richardson appointed Goodacre to the State Quarter Design Committee to develop a U.S. quarter coin representing New Mexico.

Goodacre retired from sculpting in 2016.

Personal life
In March 2007, while in Santa Fe, Goodacre suffered a fall and head injury. After initially being taken to St. Vincent's Hospital in Santa Fe, Goodacre was transferred to the Craig Hospital brain trauma center in Englewood, Colorado, after a fall injury sent her into a coma on March 13. An MRI disclosed that she had suffered a massive head injury. Goodacre's husband, C.L. Mike Schmidt, told reporters, "We don't know if Glenna fainted and fell, or had a mini-stroke and fell." Schmidt reported on April 9, 2007, that his wife had made major progress in the preceding three days. In August 2007, she returned home from the hospital. On January 18, 2008, Goodacre was well enough to unveil her new sculpture "Crossing the Prairie" at the St. Vincent Regional Medical Center in Santa Fe. She was reported to have recovered very well but had lingering problems with concentration because of aphasia.

She was the mother of Tim Goodacre and 1980s model Jill Goodacre, who is married to the singer and actor Harry Connick Jr.

Glenna Goodacre died of natural causes in Santa Fe on April 13, 2020 at the age of 80.

Selected portraiture
Stephen F. Austin, Anheuser-Busch, SeaWorld, San Antonio, Texas
 Dan Blocker (Bonanza co-star), 1973, O'Donnell, Texas, across from O'Donnell Heritage Museum
Dwight D. Eisenhower 1987, Anheuser-Busch, SeaWorld of Texas
William Curry Holden, historian, archaeologist, and first director of the Museum of Texas Tech University in Lubbock, bust located in rotunda of Holden Hall
Ralph A. Johnston, National Cowboy & Western Heritage Museum, Oklahoma City
Scott Joplin, 1987, Anheuser-Busch, Sea World of Texas
Barbara Jordan, 1987, Anheuser-Busch, Sea World of Texas
Katherine Ann Porter, 1986, Anheuser-Busch, Sea World of Texas
Ronald W. Reagan, After the Ride, 1998, Ronald Reagan Presidential Library and Museum, Simi Valley
Eric Sloane, National Cowboy & Western Heritage Museum, Oklahoma City
William Worrall Mayo, Charles Horace Mayo, William J. Mayo, "Ancestors", Mayo Clinic, Arizona

Selected public monuments

Rescue, (1999), Montgomery Museum of Fine Arts, Blount Cultural Park, Montgomery, Alabama
The Puddle Jumpers, (1989), Montgomery Museum of Fine Arts, Blount Cultural Park, Montgomery, Alabama
Raising the Flag or Pledge of Allegiance, (1991), Stroh's Plaza, Detroit, Michigan
Vietnam Women's Memorial, National Mall, Washington D.C. (1993)
Philosopher's Rock. (1994), Austin, Texas
The Irish Memorial, (2003) Penn's Landing, Philadelphia, Pennsylvania
Crossing the Prairie, 2002, Texas Tech University Health Sciences Center, Amarillo, Texas

References

Edson, Gary, ed., Glenna Goodacre: The First 25 Years, Museum of Texas Tech University, Lubbock, Texas,  1995
Kvaran, Einar Einarsson, Monuments in America, unpublished manuscript
Lubbock native Goodacre talks of joyous homecoming

External links

 Glenna Goodacre's website
 Renowned local sculptor comatose after suffering head injury
 Artist's condition improving; Goodacre moving to Colorado brain injury facility

1939 births
2020 deaths
American women sculptors
Artists from Santa Fe, New Mexico
Sculptors from Texas
Art Students League of New York alumni
Colorado College alumni
Monterey High School (Lubbock, Texas) alumni
People from Lubbock, Texas
American currency designers
20th-century American women artists
Cowgirl Hall of Fame inductees
Sculptors from New Mexico
20th-century American sculptors
21st-century American women artists
21st-century American sculptors
Women graphic designers
Coin designers